The Yamaha Aerox is a lineup of single-cylinder scooters made by Yamaha since 1997, available in either 50 cc or 100 cc for the European market, and 125 cc or 155 cc for the Southeast Asian market with several different body designs.

Markets

Europe 
Slight changes were made in 2003. The Aerox was renamed to Aerox R and the 100 cc model was discontinued.. The 2-stroke 50 cc model was updated with a newer exhaust, tachometer and a newer type of ignition and CDI. In 2013, Yamaha launched the updated Aerox with an updated body design and the introduction of the Aerox Naked and Aerox 4 (equipped with 4-stroke engine).

Southeast Asia

Aerox 125 

The liquid-cooled 4-stroke 2-valve 125 cc model of the Aerox was launched in Indonesia in January 2016 under the name Aerox 125 LC. It was only sold in Indonesia and discontinued ten months later due to low demand. This model was succeeded by the 155 cc Aerox 155.

Aerox 155 
The liquid-cooled 4-stroke 4-valve 125 cc/155 cc version of the Aerox was unveiled at Sepang International Circuit in Malaysia in October 2016. These engines are shared with the NMAX. It is sold under the Aerox 155 name in Indonesia and Thailand, Mio Aerox 155 in the Philippines, NVX 155 in Malaysia, NVX 125/155 in Vietnam and Aerosports X 155 in China.

The Aerox 155 received its redesign in November 2020.

Other than Southeast Asia, the Aerox 155 has also been made available in India since September 2021.

References

External links 

  (UK) 
  (Indonesia)
  (India) 
 Yamaha Aerox history

Aeorox
Motor scooters
Motorcycles introduced in 1997